Overlord is an action role-playing video game series published by Codemasters. The franchise was introduced in 2007 and has received six video games to date. The latest game is Overlord: Fellowship of Evil.

Games

Overlord (2007)

The first video game of the franchise was announced in 2006 after the development stretching a year and a half. It was developed by Triumph Studios and published by Codemasters. The game was initially released for Xbox 360, Microsoft Windows, Linux and PlayStation 3 on 26 June 2007.

Overlord: Raising Hell (2008)

An expand version to the original work, titled Overlord: Raising Hell, was initially available for Microsoft Windows and Xbox 360 on 15 February 2008. A PlayStation 3 version was later ported by 4J Studios and first released on 26 June 2007.

Overlord II (2009)

Overlord II is the sequel to the 2007 video game Overlord. It was still developed by Triumph Studios and published by Codemasters. It was available on Linux, Microsoft Windows, PlayStation 3 and Xbox 360 platforms.

Overlord: Dark Legend (2009)

A spin-off series to Overlord II, titled Overlord: Dark Legend, was released on Wii. It was developed by Climax Action and initially available on 23 June 2009.

Overlord: Minions (2009)

Another spin-off series to Overlord II, titled Overlord: Minions, was released on Nintendo DS. It was developed by Climax Action and initially available on 23 June 2009.

Overlord: Fellowship of Evil (2015)

The sixth video game of franchise and a third spin-off, titled Overlord: Fellowship of Evil, was developed and published by Codemasters for Microsoft Windows, PlayStation 4 and Xbox One. It was scheduled to be released on 29 September 2015 worldwide, but was postponed to 20 October.

References

External links
 Overlord series at MobyGames

 
Electronic Arts franchises
Video game franchises introduced in 2007